Rue is a commune in the Somme department in Hauts-de-France in northern France.

Geography
Rue station has rail connections to Amiens, Calais and Paris.

Population

Toponymy
The place is first mentioned as Rua in 1042 (diplôme Henrici Regis Gall. Christ, then Rugua in 1090 - 1110, Rue in 1184.

Medieval place name meaning "street" in French (French word rue is ultimately from Latin ruga).

Places of interest
 The chapel of the Holy Spirit (1440–1514) is one of the finest examples of flamboyant gothic in Picardie.
 The bell tower, which in 2005 was inscribed on the UNESCO World Heritage List along with other belfries of Belgium and France because of their architecture and testimony to the rise of municipal power in the region.

See also
Communes of the Somme department
Le Chateau du Broutel

References

External links

 Official website of the commune

Communes of Somme (department)
Picardy